Egger may mean:

Egger Island, an island in Greenland
Egger-bahn; model railway manufacturer
Easter egger
Egger (company); wood based panel manufacturer 
Egger (surname)
Egger (band), was active in 2005

See also
Ecker
Eggers (surname), a surname
Eggar (disambiguation)